Moran Atias (born 9 April 1981) is an Israeli actress and model. She gained fame in the Italian films Gas, Oggi sposi, and Mother of Tears. She is best known for her work with Paul Haggis in the 2008 TV series Crash and the 2013 film Third Person. She also starred on the FX television series Tyrant.

Early life
Atias was born in Haifa, Israel, to parents of Moroccan Jewish descent. Her grandfather was a rabbi. She appeared on the youth television programme Out of Focus at age 15. Her plan to serve as a soldier in the Israel Defense Forces was frustrated by a diagnosis of meningitis at age 17. She pursued modelling instead in Germany and then in Italy, where she was discovered and became a model for Roberto Cavalli. Her younger sister is Israeli actress Shani Atias.

Career

Modelling
Atias first appeared on television when she was 15, starring in the Israeli youth program Out of Focus. By the age of 17, she went to Germany to launch her modelling career. She modelled for Roberto Cavalli, D&G, and BBG jewellers. Later, she hosted an Italian talk show.

Acting, other film work

Israel and Italy
After establishing herself as a model, she was encouraged to pursue a career in acting. Her work in these films led to her being cast in the Italian feature film Gas, in which she played a provocative drug addict tasked with seducing a gay drug addict. She followed that up with the romantic comedy Oggi Sposi, directed by Luca Luncini and Mother of Tears, the third and final installment of Dario Argento's supernatural horror trilogy The Three Mothers. Mother of Tears premièred at the 2007 Toronto International Film Festival and the Rome Film Festival.

United States
In 2008, she was cast in the role of the illegal immigrant Inez in the drama series Crash, based on Paul Haggis's Oscar-winning film. After one season, she became the female lead opposite Dennis Hopper. Working with Haggis led to her being cast in his film The Next Three Days.

In 2011, Atias worked with Cynthia Mort on the television project Radical, playing to role of Ana, which Mort had written specifically for her. In 2012 she was cast in the critically acclaimed Israeli television series Allenby Street, directed by Assaf Bernstein of Fauda fame, where she played the stripper Mika, a formerly Orthodox Jewish girl who avoids her childhood secret while living a complex nightlife. She also served as a producer and worked to adapt it into a US series. She was cast in the new FX series Tyrant by the creators of the successful television series Homeland by creator and fellow Israeli, Gideon Raff.

Her work on the film The Next Three Days led to Third Person, a project that Atias pitched and helped develop with Paul Haggis. She was chosen to play the role of 'Monika,' a Romanian gypsy. To prepare for the role, she lived in Italy for four months and immersed herself in the gypsy lifestyle, living without the basics of running water or electricity. She studied with Michael Margota at the Italian Actor's Studio to perfect the Italian and Romanian accents. She also served as a co-producer and a co-consultant for the script. The film premiered at the 2013 Toronto International Film Festival.

Humanitarian work
In Italy, she was the 2005–06 spokeswoman for the City of Milan in their campaigns against graffiti and animal cruelty in the city.

Atias participated in the Artists for Peace and Justice (APJ) volunteer mission with Sean Penn following the 2010 Haiti earthquake, in which she assisted the evacuation of refugees to Florida. During her second trip to Haiti, she took part in a workshop at Ciné Institute in Jacmel. In May 2010, she worked with APJ and hosted and organized a charity event at the Cannes Film Festival. In November 2010, she hosted and organized a charity event for APJ in New York, with proceeds going to the first free high school for the children of the slums of Haiti.

She is a goodwill ambassador for IsraAid, and took part in humanitarian work in Haiti after the 2010 earthquake there.

Moran volunteered at the coronavirus patients ward in Ichilov hospital in Tel Aviv, April 2020.

Personal life
In February 2017, Atias became a naturalized U.S. citizen.

Films, TV series, video games

Television

Hosting
Kdam Eurovision (2005) – First Channel, Israel
Deal or No Deal
Game programme (13 total), (2005) – Channel 10, Israel
"Cinderella" Biographical documentary of Moran Atias, prime time (2004) – Channel 10, Israel

TV series
 Crash, a Starz network series, recurring cast (2008), and second season (2009) regular cast
 CSI: NY, guest star (2010)
 Rules of Engagement episode "Anniversary Chicken", guest star as Sophia (2011)
 White Collar, role of Christie (2011)
 Tyrant, role of Leila Al-Fayeed (2014–2016)
 24: Legacy, role of Sidra (2017)

Italian TV programmes as sidekick
"Carramba Che Fortuna" – RaiUno, Italy (2000)
"Superconvenscion" – RaiDue, Italy (2000–01)
"Italiani" – Canale 5, Italy (2001)
"Matricole & Meteore" – Italia 1, Italy (2003)
"I Raccomandati" – RaiUno, Italy (2003–04)
"Natalino Balasso Show" – Italia 1, Italy (2004–05)

Magazines
Men's Health United States
Nylon Guys United States
Gioia magazine cover
Vanity Fair Italy
Cosmopolitan – Covers for Spain, Israel, Serbia, Mexico
Maxim United States
Maxim Israel Cover
Flaunt United States
Men's Fitness United States
944 USA
60 Magazine – writing a monthly column for an established fashion magazine for the female audience.
Rosh 1 – teen magazine
Photo Italy, Max Italy 2002–2004, Corriere della Sera Special Moda, Capital Italy, Class Italy, Onda TV, Happy Web, Leisha Israel, AT Israel, Pnai Plus Israel, GO Magazine, Blazer Israel, Olam HaIsha Israel, Yedioth and Maariv Israeli newspapers

Radio workShaker – Radio RTL 102.5 – a radio programme created and presented by Moran Atias (2005)

References

External links

Moran Atias photos on TV Guide''

1981 births
Living people
20th-century American actresses
21st-century American actresses
American female models
American film actresses
American people of Moroccan-Jewish descent
American radio actresses
American Sephardic Jews
American television personalities
Israeli emigrants to the United States
Israeli expatriates in Italy
Israeli female models
Israeli film actresses
Israeli people of Moroccan-Jewish descent
Israeli radio actresses
Israeli television personalities
Jewish American actresses
Jewish female models
Jewish Israeli actresses
People from Haifa
Naturalized citizens of the United States
21st-century American Jews